Erich Suhrbier (born 25 April 1938) is a West German sprint canoer who competed in the mid to late 1960s. He won a bronze medal in the K-2 10000 m event at the 1963 ICF Canoe Sprint World Championships in Jajce.

Suhrbier also competed in two Summer Olympics, earning his best finish of fourth in the K-1 1000 m event at Tokyo in 1964.

References

Sports-reference.com profile

1938 births
Canoeists at the 1964 Summer Olympics
Canoeists at the 1968 Summer Olympics
German male canoeists
Living people
Olympic canoeists of the United Team of Germany
Olympic canoeists of West Germany
ICF Canoe Sprint World Championships medalists in kayak